The 1868 United States presidential election in Rhode Island took place on November 3, 1868, as part of the 1868 United States presidential election. Voters chose four representatives, or electors to the Electoral College, who voted for president and vice president.

Rhode Island voted for the Republican nominee, Ulysses S. Grant, over the Democratic nominee, Horatio Seymour. Grant won the state by a margin of 32.98%.

With 66.49% of the popular vote, Rhode Island would be Grant's fifth strongest victory in terms of popular vote percentage after Vermont, Massachusetts, Kansas and Tennessee.

Results

See also
 United States presidential elections in Rhode Island

References

Rhode Island
1868
1868 Rhode Island elections